Nikola Stanković (born 18 December 1993) is a Serbian professional footballer who plays as a left back for Radnički Niš.

Club career
Born in Sombor, Nikola passed Crvenka youth categories, and also spent six months with Partizan youth team. He made his first senior appearances during the spring half of the 2011–12 season. Stanković played over 70 matches playing for Inđija between 2012 and 2015. For the 2015–16 season, he moved to OFK Bačka. After the club promoted in the Serbian SuperLiga, he left at the end of season, and later signed three-year contract with Radnički Niš.

International career
Stanković made his international debut for the Serbia national football team in a friendly 3-0 loss to Qatar.

Career statistics

References

External links
 
 
 
 

1993 births
Sportspeople from Sombor
Living people
Serbian footballers
Serbia international footballers
Association football defenders
FK Inđija players
OFK Bačka players
FK Radnički Niš players
Athlitiki Enosi Larissa F.C. players
FK Voždovac players
Serbian First League players
Serbian SuperLiga players
Super League Greece players
Serbian expatriate footballers
Expatriate footballers in Greece
Serbian expatriate sportspeople in Greece